Lupoglav is a village in central Croatia, located between Brckovljani and Kloštar Ivanić. The population is 1,086 (census 2011).

References

Populated places in Zagreb County